Hapeville High School was a high school in Hapeville, Georgia, United States.  The school closed in 1988 when it was combined with Woodland High School, College Park High School and Russell High School to form Tri-Cities High School.  Hapeville High is now Hapeville Elementary, which brought all the elementary schools in the city into one building.

Notable alumni
 Jeff Foxworthy (1977), comedian known for his eponymous sitcom
 Kelly Mote, football player

References

1988 disestablishments in Georgia (U.S. state)
Educational institutions disestablished in 1988
Educational institutions in the United States with year of establishment missing
Former high schools in Georgia (U.S. state)
Fulton County School System high schools